Vermont had no apportionment in the House of Representatives before 1790 census because it was not admitted to the Union until 1791. Vermont's election laws at the time required a majority to win election to the House of Representatives.

See also 
 United States House of Representatives elections, 1792 and 1793
 List of United States representatives from Vermont

References 

Vermont
1793
United States House of Representatives